The Village of La Jolla is a beach resort community located in La Jolla, San Diego, on the South Coast of California. 

La Jolla, San Diego
Neighborhoods in San Diego
Shopping districts and streets in the United States